This is a list of events in Scottish television from 1960.

Events
August – The ITV franchise for North East Scotland is awarded to North of Scotland Television Limited, from seven applications.
Unknown – The ITV franchise for the Anglo-Scottish border region is awarded to Border Television, from two applications. The other bid came from Solway Television.

Television series
Scotsport (1957–2008)
The White Heather Club (1958–1968)

Births
18 June – Paul Coia, television presenter and continuity announcer
6 October – Richard Jobson, television presenter and singer-songwriter
Unknown – Richard Gordon, radio and television broadcaster
Unknown – Andy Gray, actor

See also
1960 in Scotland

 
Television in Scotland by year
1960s in Scottish television